The Battle of Ichirai (市来鶴丸城の戦い) was fought in 1539 between two rival factions of the Shimazu clan.

Shimazu Katsuhisa, who presided over the Shimazu family, did not have a son and he was driven out by Shimazu Sanehisa, who was the head of another branch, the Sasshū (薩州家). Sanehisa then laid claim to be the head of the clan without being properly recognized by the rest of the families. Katsuhisa asked Shimazu Tadayoshi for help to regain his position, and Tadayoshi sent his son Shimazu Takahisa to be adopted by Katsuhisa as a condition for his help.

Takahisa took over the position of head of the family from Katsuhisa in 1526. The recognition of Takahisa as the clan head did not occur until 1539, at the Battle of Ichirai, when Tadayoshi defeated Katsuhisa (who would later regain power).

Ichirai
1539 in Japan
Shimazu clan
Conflicts in 1539